Wenzhou or Wen Prefecture was a zhou (prefecture) in imperial China seated in modern Wen County in Gansu, China. It existed (intermittently) from 558 to 1371.

Geography
Its administrative area is not well-known, but Wenzhou was on one of the few accessible routes to modern Sichuan and therefore a strategic prefecture.

References

 

Prefectures of the Tang dynasty
Prefectures of the Song dynasty
Prefectures of Former Shu
Prefectures of Later Shu
Prefectures of Qi (Five Dynasties)
Prefectures of Later Tang
Former prefectures in Gansu
Prefectures of the Yuan dynasty
Subprefectures of the Ming dynasty
Prefectures of the Jin dynasty (1115–1234)